Playful Pan is a Silly Symphonies animated Disney short film. It was released on December 27, 1930, by Columbia Pictures.

Plot
The short features the mythological god Pan playing his pan flute for the entertainment of the forest dwellers. When a lightning strike starts a forest fire, Pan leads the flames to the water, putting out the fire.

Reception
Variety (April 22, 1931) called the short an "excellent cartoon", saying, "It elicits laughs all the way and is beautifully synchronized to fit a novel idea, that of Peter Pan with his pipes, stirring animals and insects on the arrival of spring. Too much repetition in opening shots. Last three or four minutes of short devoted to a forest fire with the shooting flames represented as living characters and jumping on to everything, chasing woods inhabitants to cover. They run for Pan and he charms them with music until all jump into a pool of water where he stands. This part of short actually very funny. Longer than most cartoons, but worth the footage."

Home media
The short was released on December 19, 2006, on Walt Disney Treasures: More Silly Symphonies, Volume Two.

References

External links
 

1930 films
1930 short films
1930s Disney animated short films
Silly Symphonies
1930 animated films
Animated films based on classical mythology
Films directed by Burt Gillett
Films produced by Walt Disney
American black-and-white films
Columbia Pictures animated short films
Columbia Pictures short films
Animated films without speech
Films about deities
Films about wildfires
Pan (god)
1930s American films